Woodenhead is a 2003 New Zealand film directed by Florian Habicht.

The film is a dark fairy tale in the style of the Brothers Grimm, and recounts the story of a dump-hand called Gert escorting a princess called Plum to her wedding. The two wander into the forest with a donkey and mysterious things start to happen. The film explores the dark sexual material in this mythic context.

The film is unusual in that the sound and music were recorded before the film was shot, and does not match the visuals. It is in crisp black and white and was shot in the Northland Region. The voices of the main two characters are musicians Steve Abel and Mardi Potter and the actors are Nicholas Butler (NZ) and Teresa Peters.

The film was shown in the 2003 Auckland, Wellington and Melbourne international film festivals and has been released on DVD.

Florian Habicht has also made a film called Kaikohe Demolition, a loving look at the demolition derby in his hometown Kaikohe, and Rubbings from a Live Man, an intimate documentary about New Zealand actor, writer and director Warwick Broadhead.

Trivia
Habicht states on the DVD that the film was inspired by a dream in which two angels appearing as Milli Vanilli fly into a stadium and tell him that the band lip-synched their music, apparently unaware that this is common knowledge. They then tell him to make a film where the sound is recorded before the visuals.

While it would have been hard to resist such a disarming directive, Habicht realised there were also some definite advantages in making a low-budget film in this way. It enabled him to focus separately on the visual and aural components of the film, allowing him, for example, to cast people who had the look he wanted but who weren't necessarily trained as actors. With a limited amount of money to spend on the film (around $30,000), Habicht also realised that he could achieve much higher quality results by taking care of the sound in a recording studio, rather than on location. He didn't need to take a sound recordist with him on the shoot, and normal concerns such as traffic noise were a non-issue.

Furthermore, this style of filmmaking suited the filmmaker's intuitive style perfectly, giving the film a surreal, otherworldly feel. As well as being literally out of synch, he also accentuated the oddness by mismatching the soundtrack with what you see – often you'll find sweet and innocent dialogue accompanying grotesque and sometimes violent visuals or a South Island kea screeching on a North Auckland road. He also enjoyed giving the actors voices that were incongruous with the way they looked.

References
 Background from NZ On Screen, available through Creative Commons

External links
 Woodenhead Music Video plus photos and info on NZ On Screen
 
 
 The films of Florian Habicht official website

2003 films
2000s New Zealand films
2000s avant-garde and experimental films
2000s road movies
New Zealand fantasy films
2000s English-language films